In bone surgery, a corticotomy is a cutting of the bone that may or may not split it into two pieces (bone fracture) but involves cortex only, leaving intact the medullary vessels and periosteum. Corticotomy is particularly important in distraction osteogenesis or surgically facilitated orthodontic therapy.

References
 Bone repair techniques, bone graft, and bone graft substitutes. CR Perry - Clin. Orthop. Rel. Res, 1999 - corronline.com

Orthopedic surgical procedures